HMNZS Tui (T234) was a  of the Royal New Zealand Navy. She was commissioned in 1941 for minesweeping and anti-submarine roles. Tui was the first of two ships with this name to serve in the Royal New Zealand Navy and was named after a native bird from New Zealand.

War service
In March 1942 in Scotland, Tui and the four s, Killegray, Inchkeith, Sanda and Scarba had been newly built for New Zealand. They were formed into a flotilla and departed from the River Clyde with a convoy bound for Canada. The trawler flotilla then left for Auckland, arriving there in August.

In Auckland, Tui was assigned to the 25th Minesweeping Flotilla and sailed for Suva to replace . The 25th Minesweeping Flotilla had been offered to COMSOPAC, and by early December Tui, Moa, and Kiwi with Matai as flotilla leader, were all together at Nouméa ready to move north. They sailed for the Solomons, escorting a convoy some of the way. Making Tulagi their base they began anti-submarine screen patrols on 19 December 1942 off Tulagi and Lunga Point, Guadalcanal.

Landing barges
On 21 January 1943, Tui and Moa came across four Japanese landing barges stopped close inshore. When Tui and Moa closed in, those aboard the barges opened fire with machine guns and small arms and got underway. At close range Moa fired on the leading barge, but a fluke shot passed through the  gun aperture, ignited a cordite charge and injured all seven in the gun crew.  Moa managed to silence the first barge and sink the last in line with  gunfire, then withdrew and attended to the cordite fire and injuries. Tui then opened fire on the barges, sinking one with her 4-inch gun, and the remaining two escaped inshore in the darkness.

Submarine I-17
On 19 August 1943, while escorting a convoy from Nouméa, Tui picked up a submarine contact. She made an initial run over it without using depth charges, a second run dropping two depth charges, and a third run throwing another two depth charges. Contact was lost and Tui signalled some US Kingfisher seaplanes  of US Scouting Squadron VS-57, based in New Caledonia, to join the search. One of these indicated that Tui should investigate smoke on the horizon, where a submarine was sighted on the surface and Tui opened fire at maximum range, scoring one, possibly two hits.

Ninety-one crewmen were lost and Tui picked up six survivors who said that Tuis depth charge attacks had damaged the submarine and forced it to the surface.

The commanding officer and anti-submarine control officer on Tui had doubted whether the contact was really a submarine, so the depth-charge attacks were not properly carried out. A later Naval Board report concluded that "had the proper procedure been followed and a full depth-charge pattern fired in the original attack, there is little doubt but that the submarine would have been destroyed."

I-17 was the first Axis ship to shell the United States mainland when she shelled an oil refinery near Santa Barbara on 23 February 1942.

Other service
COMSOPAC released the New Zealand ships in June 1945, and Tui departed the Solomons escorting a group of six RNZN Fairmiles. On her return to Auckland, Tui worked with Kiwi and the 7th Trawler Group on the final clearing of the German minefield in the outer Hauraki Gulf.

Post-war service
Tui was put in reserve in June 1946.

Training
In 1952 the Navy wanted to free some s for service in the Korean War. Tui was recommissioned in February 1952 to take over training duties previously undertaken by the frigate . This training was carried out for the Naval Volunteer Reserve and included training for compulsory reservists as well as volunteer reservists and sea cadets.

She was also used part-time by the DSIR and the Naval Research Laboratory (NRL).

Oceanographic research
In October 1955 Tui was docked for conversion to an oceanographic research ship. On 5 March 1956, the now disarmed Tui was recommissioned and reclassified as a fleet auxiliary. She made many scientific cruises for the DSIR and NRL to places around New Zealand and Pacific islands.

Fate
Tui was decommissioned for the last time on 22 December 1967. She was stripped of her equipment and sold in December 1969 to Pacific Scrap Ltd who demolished her. She was replaced in 1970 by a purpose-built oceanographic ship with the same name.

See also
 Minesweepers of the Royal New Zealand Navy
 Survey ships of the Royal New Zealand Navy

Notes

References
 McDougall, R J  (1989) New Zealand Naval Vessels. Page 59-61. Government Printing Office.

Further reading
 Harker, Jack (2000)The Rockies: New Zealand Minesweepers at War. Silver Owl Press.

External links
 Royal NZ Navy's Bird-class ships New Zealand Ministry for Culture and Heritage. Updated 20 December 2012.

Survey ships of the Royal New Zealand Navy
World War II minesweepers of New Zealand
Ships built on the River Clyde
Training ships of the Royal New Zealand Navy